Anycles anthracina is a moth of the subfamily Arctiinae. It was described by Francis Walker in 1854. It is found in Mexico, Guatemala, Panama, Venezuela and Brazil.

References

Moths described in 1854
Euchromiina
Moths of North America
Moths of South America